Adam Hemati (born at 22 January 1995) is an Iranian-Canadian footballer who is currently a free agent. He signed his first professional contract with Persepolis in the Persian Gulf Pro League where they reached the Asian Champions League Final in 2018.

Club career

Persepolis
In 2017, Hemati signed a professional contract with Persepolis of the Persian Gulf Pro League. He debuted for Persepolis in December 2017 in a match against Zob Ahan. He opened his scoring account in his fourth appearance for the club, scoring a goal for Persepolis in a 1–0 win over Sepidrood; this was his only goal in his career in Persepolis. He continued making appearances in games (as many key Persepolis players were injured and could not play) throughout the season, being an important player in the 2018 AFC Champions League, resulting in Persepolis becoming AFC Champions League runner-up.

Pars Jam 
On 13 January 2020, Hemati signed a contract with Iranian club Pars Jonoubi Jam.
He left the club on 12 August 2020

Sumgayit
Hemati joined Sumgayit FK in August 2020 and made his UEFA debut on 27 August 2020 in a UEFA Europa League qualifying match against KF Shkëndija.

International career
Hemati was called up to the Canada men's national soccer team by manager Octavio Zambrano.

Career statistics

Honours
Persepolis
Persian Gulf Pro League (2): 2017–18, 2018–19
Hazfi Cup (1): 2018–19
Iranian Super Cup (2): 2018, 2019
AFC Champions League runner-up: 2018

References

External links
 

1995 births
Living people
Association football midfielders
Canadian soccer players
Canadian expatriate soccer players
Soccer players from Toronto
Sportspeople from Scarborough, Toronto
Sportspeople of Iranian descent
Canadian people of Iranian descent
Expatriate soccer players in the United States
Canadian expatriate sportspeople in the United States
Expatriate footballers in Azerbaijan
Toronto FC players
USC Upstate Spartans men's soccer players
Toronto Metropolitan University alumni
Persepolis F.C. players
Sumgayit FK players
Championnat National 2 players
Persian Gulf Pro League players
Azerbaijan Premier League players
North Toronto Nitros players